Malampaya may refer to:

 The Malampaya gas field
 Malampaya Sound